The Scottish Childminding Association (SCMA) is a charity and membership organisation based in Stirling, Scotland. It provides support, training and information to childminders in Scotland. SCMA's Convenor is  Barbara Anne Dennistoun and its Chief Executive is Graeme McAllister.

Registration
By law, childminding services in Scotland must be registered with the Care Inspectorate the independent regulator of social care and social work services across Scotland. The Care Inspectorate regulates childminding services according to the Public Services Reform (Scotland) Act 2010 and assesses their quality to make sure they meet the National Care Standards which are published by the Scottish Government.

Community Childminding 
SCMA's Community Childminding Service provides short-term childcare for families in need. Community Childminding Services currently operate in Aberdeen, Dumfries and Galloway, Fife, Glasgow, West Lothian and the Scottish Borders.

Communications
The Association publishes a quarterly magazine, Childminding, and operates a helpline.

See also
Day care
Northern Ireland Childminding Association
Professional Association for Childcare and Early Years (PACEY) (England and Wales)

References

External links
 Official website: Scottish Childminding Association
 Professional Association for Childcare and Early Years (PACEY) (England and Wales)

Child care skills organizations
Non-profit organisations based in Scotland